

Serbia men's national water polo team championship results

Olympic Games

World Aquatics Championship

European Championship

FINA World League

FINA Water Polo World Cup

Mediterranean Games

Junior and Youth Results

World Junior Championship

World Youth Championship U-18

European U-19 Championship

European Junior Championship

Player statistics and records

Most appearances
Professional friendly and competitive matches only where Yugoslavia, Serbia and Montenegro and now Serbia were represented.

Top scorers
Professional friendly and competitive matches only where Yugoslavia, Serbia and Montenegro and now Serbia were represented.

 

Statistics accurate as of matches played 11 August 2017

References

+
National team
Serbia